Niels Juel (8 May 1629 – 8 April 1697) was a Danish admiral and a naval hero. He served as supreme command of the Dano-Norwegian Navy during the late 17th century and oversaw development of the Danish-Norwegian Navy.

Background
Niels Juel was born the son of Erik Juel and Sophie Sehested, both of whom were descended from Danish nobility, who lived in Jutland where the father had a career as a local functionary and judge.  He was the brother of the diplomat Jens Juel (1631–1700). Niels Juel was born in Christiania, Norway, where his family sought refuge during the 1627 invasion of Jutland during the Thirty Years' War, while his father took part in the defense of the country at home. The following year after the occupation had ended, the family was reunited in Jutland. From 1635 to 1642, Juel was brought up by his aunt Karen Sehested (1606–1672) at the Stenalt estate near Randers. 

In 1647 Juel was enrolled at the Sorø Academy.

Career
In 1652 Juel entered Dutch naval service. He served his naval apprenticeship under Dutch Admiral Maarten Tromp (1598–1653) and Dutch Admiral Michiel de Ruyter (1607–1676), taking part in all the major engagements of the First Anglo-Dutch War, a conflict between England and the Dutch Republic. From 1654–56, he attended Admiral Michiel de Ruyter on two trips to the Mediterranean during engagements against North African pirates. During an indisposition at Amsterdam in 1655–1656 he acquired a thorough knowledge of shipbuilding. In 1656 he returned to Copenhagen and entered Danish service as a naval officer, and in 1657 he was appointed admiral. He served with distinction during the Dano-Swedish War (1658–60) and took a prominent part in the defence of Copenhagen against the forces of King Charles X of Sweden.

During fifteen years of peace, Juel, as admiral of the fleet, labored assiduously to develop and improve the Royal Dano-Norwegian Navy, though he bitterly resented the setting over his head in 1663 of Vice-Admiral Cort Adeler (1622–1675), on his return from service to the Republic of Venice during the Turkish wars. In 1675, at the outbreak of the Scanian War, he served at first under Adeler, but on the death of the latter in November 1675 he was appointed to the supreme command.

Juel then won a European reputation, and raised Danish sea-power to unprecedented eminence, by the system of naval tactics, which consisted of cutting off a part of the enemy's force and concentrating the whole attack on it. He first employed this maneuver at the Battle of Jasmund off Rügen (25 May 1676) when he broke through the enemy's line in close column and cut off five of their ships, despite nightfall prevented him from pursuing them. Juel's operations were considerably hampered at this period by the conduct of his auxiliary, Dutch Lieutenant Admiral Philips van Almonde (1644–1711), who accused the Danish admiral of cowardice. A few days after the battle of Jasmund, Dutch Admiral Cornelis Tromp (1629–1691) with 17 fresh Danish and Dutch ships of the line, superseded Juel in the supreme command. Juel took a leading part in Cornelis Tromp's great victory off Battle of Öland (1 June 1676), which enabled the Danes to invade Scania unopposed.

On 1 June 1677, Juel defeated the Swedish admiral Erik Carlsson Sjöblad (1647–1725) during the Battle of Møn. On 30 June 1677 he won his greatest victory, in the Battle of Køge Bay southwest of Copenhagen. With 25 ships of the line and 1267 guns, he routed the Swedish admiral Henrik Horn (1618–1693) with 36 ships of the line and 1800 guns. For this great triumph, the reward of superior seamanship and strategy at an early stage of the engagement, Juel's experienced eye told him that the wind in the course of the day would shift from S.W. to W. and he took extraordinary risks accordingly; he was made lieutenant admiral general and a privy councillor. This victory, besides permanently crippling the Swedish navy, gave the Danes the self-confidence to become less dependent on their Dutch allies.

In the following year Cornelis Tromp was discharged by King Christian V, who gave the supreme command to Juel. In the spring of 1678 Juel put to sea with 84 ships carrying 2,400 cannon, but as the Swedes were no longer had the naval strength to engage such a formidable fleet on the open sea, his operations were limited to blockading the Swedish ports and transporting troops to Rügen. After the Treaty of Lund in 1679, Juel showed himself an administrator and reformer of the first order, and under his energetic supervision the Danish navy ultimately reached imposing dimensions, especially after Juel became chief of the admiralty in 1683.

Personal life

Juel was married to Margrethe Ulfeldt (1641–1703) in 1661. She was the daughter of nobleman Knud Ulfeldt (1609–1657) and Vibeke Podebusk (1608–1645). She was betrothed to him after her father died when she was 20, he was 30 years old. She gave birth to their four children between 1664 and 1672.

In 1674 Juel was awarded a Danish knighthood. In 1678, he was granted title to Valdemar's Castle (Danish: Valdemars Slot) on the island of Tåsinge. He died in 1697 at 68 years of age. He and his wife were buried in the Niels Juel chapel at the Holmen Church in Copenhagen.

See also
Statue of Niels Juel
HDMS Niels Juel

References

Other sources
Barfod, Jørgen H. (1977) Niels Juel: A Danish Admiral of the 17th century (Marinehistorisk Selskab)

Related reading
 Barfod, Jørgen H. (1997) Niels Juels flåde. (Gyldendal, Copenhagen)  
Probst, Niels M. (2005) Niels Juel: vor største flådefører (Statens Forsvarshistoriske Museum)  

1629 births
1697 deaths
17th-century Danish naval officers
Danish nobility
Royal Dano-Norwegian Navy personnel
People from Oslo
Danish admirals
People of the Scanian War
Juel family
Noble Knights of the Order of the Dannebrog